The Shark River is a major distributary of  Harney River in the southwestern portion of Everglades National Park. It is located in Monroe County, Florida, United States. The river is entirely sea level. The mouth of the river is at Ponce de Leon Bay, part of the Gulf of Mexico.

References

Category of Florida
Everglades
Everglades National Park
Bodies of water of Monroe County, Florida